Back Down may refer to:

"Back Down", a song by 50 Cent from the album Get Rich or Die Tryin'''
"Back Down", a song by Sugababes from the album Change''